Albert J. Levis (born 1937) is a Greek psychiatrist and author of the Formal Theory of Behavior. He is also the founder and director of the Museum of the Creative Process in Manchester, Vermont. He along with his late wife, Georgette Wasserstein Levis, is the innkeeper of the Wilburton Inn, also in Manchester.

Biography 
Albert Levis was born in 1937 in Athens, Greece. to a Romaniote Jewish family with deep roots in the Greek history and culture. After surviving the Holocaust in hiding, Levis continued his studies at Athens College where he graduated in 1957 and was awarded the Capps prize for an essay on the history of the Jewish diaspora as cycles of emancipation and justification for persecutions.

He studied medicine in Switzerland at the Universities of Geneva and Zurich, 1958-1963, immigrated to the United States in 1964, married Georgette Wasserstein (sister of Bruce Wasserstein) in 1966 and completed his psychiatric residence at Yale University in 1968. He settled with his family in Hamden, Connecticut, where in 1970 he founded a clinical research and training practice, the Center for the Study of Normative Behavior. There he conducted his research work and writing of books. He retired in 2002 to dedicate his attention to the Wilburton Inn, and incorporated the Art to Science project with the vision to develop a forum for his theoretical position.

Levis also holds a wide collection of international and modern art, pieces that are now installed in the permanent exhibits at the Museum of the Creative Process. Additionally, the Museum features the Henry Gorski retrospective, a collection of the lifetime work of Gorski, as well as the Sanctuary of Wisdom, Levis's Holocaust memorial. Many items from the museum's collections have been featured in museums and gallery exhibits around the New England region.

Career 
Levis is best known for his Formal Theory, an integrative approach to behavioral analysis and personality assessment. The Formal Theory of Behavior seeks to qualify the physical properties of behavior through applying principles of Physics to the study of emotional energetic transformation. Levis has published several volumes on this research, including Conflict Analysis: The Formal Theory of Behavior and Conflict Analysis Training. Levis' Conflict Analysis Training includes among other tests the Animal Metaphor Test, an integrative projective assessment.

His study of the creative process introduced the cross-disciplinary integration of psychology, religion, art and science, revamping psychology’s epistemology, diagnostic categories, modes of assessment, features of morality as a science, and therapy as a concise program of emotional education. The Moral Science spiritualizes psychology, demystifies religions and reconciles them, while it popularizes psychotherapy as a mandatory education for the general public.

Levis, born to a Jewish family, was inspired to the discovery of the creative process working through his childhood experiences of WWII, the Holocaust and the Communist Civil War in the light of the wisdom of the Greek culture. He spent his career pondering on behavior and religions seeking to heal the person and the world.

He departed observing a phenomenon repeated five times in the Greek Cosmogony. He proceeded to unite conceptually behavior and morality with science and validated this theory demonstrating the scientific and moral nature of the creative process. He used art exhibits, and devised two technologies demonstrating the creative process as a scientific phenomenon: A self-assessment available online and a card game called Moral Monopoly.

His work was articulated in seven self-published volumes. They departed from a dramatic play, The Argives, continued with an overview of the Contributions of the Formal Theory, then a thorough presentation of the concepts in a textbook, simultaneously with a workbook that introduced the self-assessment; he continued with three volumes of evidence validating the theory. One book was on the museum exhibits, and two volumes on case studies. His research work is summed up with the Moral Monopoly, an educational card-game, applying the formal analysis to eight cultural stories integrating the religions of the world as a progression of scientific discoveries of the relational modalities improving the family institution and the abstraction on the nature of the divine. The game clarifies the six role structure of stories, their leading to alternative relational modalities, and points out the progression to improving resolutions promoting mutual respect as the key to the Moral Science. The game promotes the scientific analysis of the creative process as transformative.

Publications 

 Conflict Analysis: the Formal Theory of Behavior, outlines the principles of the Formal Theory, and develops a scientific method for understanding behavior. The textbook formulates a method of studying emotional energetic transformations with the guidance of physics, studying the dialectics of unconscious dynamics as a scientific phenomenon. 
 Conflict Analysis Training  is a workbook of exercises and assessments that lead towards greater self awareness and understanding. The book guides its readers to an understanding of their relational modality, how they deal with conflict, and how they can best improve.
 Science Stealing the Fire of the Gods and Healing the Worlds, published Summer 2011, explores in detail the Museum’s exhibits, investigating the emotional discovery present in the Gorski Retrospective, and retracing the evolution of abstraction in religious paradigms. Based upon the myth of Prometheus stealing the fire of Olympus, the book presents science as now demystifying religion and offering humanity the tools of moral life. 
 Creativity & Power Management, A Concise Program of Emotional Education I: The Clinical Delivery of the Conflict Analysis Battery: A Didactic, Diagnostic and Therapeutic Self-Assessment,  published in Spring 2016, is book of clinical case studies, illustrates a new theory, the Formal Theory, and a new therapy, Creativity and Power Management, as a concise program of emotional education utilizing the Conflict Analysis Battery and the simple scientific principles of the Formal Theory .  
 Creativity and Power Management, A Concise Program of Emotional Education II: The Psychoeducational Delivery of the Conflict Analysis Battery, published Fall 2016, is a book of case studies from clients that have completed the online emotional education program as well as cases from students and other-non clinical clients. The book presents a model of wellness education for the masses and a format for introducing emotional education to the classroom.

References

External links 
 Website for the Art to Science Project
 Website for the Wilburton Inn
 An article detailing the relevance of the Formal Theory
 An article dealing with the Henry Gorski Retrospective

1937 births
Greek emigrants to the United States
Greek Jews
American people of Greek-Jewish descent
American psychiatrists
Yale School of Medicine alumni
Living people
Romaniote Jews
Greek Holocaust survivors
Levites
People from Manchester, Vermont